Timmy Time is a British  stop-motion animated television programme for preschoolers created and produced by Jackie Cockle for the BBC's CBeebies and produced by Aardman Animations. It started broadcasting in the United Kingdom on 6 April 2009. It is a spin-off of Shaun the Sheep, itself a spin-off of the Wallace and Gromit film A Close Shave (1995).

The first two series ran for 26 episodes. In the United Kingdom, its most recent run began in September 2011 on CBeebies. In Australia, season one started in May 2009 on ABC1 and season three in May 2011 on ABC 4 Kids. The series also on Playhouse Disney, later called Disney Junior, beginning on 13 September 2010, but later ended its run in May 2014.

Premise and format
In this series, Timmy and his friends have to learn to share, make friends and accept their mistakes. They are supervised by two teachers, Harriet the Heron and Osbourne the Owl. The show is aimed at pre-school-aged children, which the company described as "a natural next step for Aardman".

The show is made up of ten-minute episodes, which do not feature much dialogue, much like Shaun the Sheep, Wallace and Gromit and A Close Shave. Shaun, his friends, Bitzer and the Farmer did not appear. A filming of one episode was featured on the Discovery Channel's How It's Made.

During the show's development, the series was simply called Timmy. CBeebies acquired UK-broadcast rights to the series in October 2007.

In 2018, Aardman collaborated with the British Council to create "Learning Time with Timmy", a show to encourage children aged 2–6 around the world to learn the English language, along with a YouTube-exclusive series and three apps.

In October 2019, Aardman announced a new "rebooted" version of the existing 78 episodes for CBeebies titled It's Timmy Time that began broadcast later on in the month. These versions feature narration from a selection of pre-school children, and are 5-minutes in length when compared to the original 10-minute episodes.

Episodes

Characters

Children 
 Timmy is a lamb who is the titular character and enjoys being in the spotlight. He is 3 years old in sheep years and later turns 4 in the episode Timmy's Birthday. In many of the episodes he gets into trouble; however, he learns from his mistakes, and often tries to help the other characters out when he can. He is best friends with Yabba, and is very close to Finlay. He also appears in Shaun the Sheep. Timmy's noise is baa.
 Yabba is a duckling who wears blue goggles and is very similar to Timmy in personality and is best friends with him. Yabba's noise is quack.
 Paxton is a piglet who is characterised by his appetite for apples and his weight. He wears a blue sweater and is never seen without it. Paxton's noise is oink.
 Mittens is a kitten who is like other kittens: she does't like getting wet or dirty and is rather sensitive. In some episodes, she seems to have feelings for Timmy. She always loves playing with picnics. Mittens' noise is mee-eew.
 Ruffy is a puppy who is energetic but can be, sometimes, mentally slow, and he is good friend, too. Ruffy's noise is ruff.
 Apricot is a hedgehog who is very quiet and skittish. When startled or frightened by someone or something she rolls up into a ball. Apricot's noise is hicoo, although she rarely speaks.
 Stripey is a badger cub who is a bit sleepy and slow as badgers are nocturnal. Stripey's noise is honk.
 Kid is a goat who has a large appetite like Paxton, and chews anything in sight. If the thing he is chewing is taken from him he does not mind; he just moves on to something else. Kid's noise is mep mep.
 Otus is an owlet who enjoys helping and looks up to Osbourne. He can be typically found reading and is very sensitive, sometimes copying Osbourne. Otus is commonly confused to be female due to his feminine voice tone and pink and purple feathers. Otus' noise is too-wit, too-hoo.
 Finlay is a fox who is excitable and full of energy. Finlay's noise is yip-yap.

Teachers 
 Harriet is a heron who speaks through caws and clicks. She is one of the two teachers. Harriet's noise is cluck.
 Osbourne is an owl who is the other teacher of the class. Osbourne's noise is hoot-hoot.

Side characters 
 Bumpy is a caterpillar who is not part of the class but has many background appearances in the show. Bumpy's noise is blee blub.
 Timmy's Mother is a sheep who is also not part of the class, but does appear in the opening sequence, "Timmy's Christmas Surprise" and the end credits. She is the only known parent in the show and also appears in Shaun The Sheep. Timmy's Mother's noise is baa.

References

External links

 
 
 
 
 Timmy Time on Disney Junior

Television series by Aardman Animations
2000s British animated television series
2000s British children's television series
2000s preschool education television series
2009 British television series debuts
2010s British animated television series
2010s British children's television series
2010s preschool education television series
2012 British television series endings
Animated preschool education television series
Animated television series without speech
BBC children's television shows
British children's animated television shows
British preschool education television series
British television spin-offs
CBeebies
Clay animation television series
English-language television shows
Shaun the Sheep
Television series about sheep